The First Mexican Republic, known also as the First Federal Republic, was a federated republic, established by the Constitution of 1824, the first constitution of independent Mexico. It was officially designated the United Mexican States. The First Mexican Republic lasted from 1824 to 1835, when conservatives under Antonio López de Santa Anna transformed it into a unitary state, the Centralist Republic of Mexico.

The republic was proclaimed on November 1, 1823 by the Supreme Executive Power, months after the fall of the Mexican Empire ruled emperor Agustin I, a former royalist military officer-turned-insurgent for independence. The federation was formally and legally established on October 4, 1824, when the  Federal Constitution of the United Mexican States came into force.

The First Republic was plagued through its entire twelve-year existence by severe financial and political instability. Political controversies, ever since the drafting of the constitution tended to center around whether Mexico should be a federal or a centralist state, with wider liberal and conservative causes attaching themselves to each faction respectively. With the exception of the inaugural office holder, Guadalupe Victoria, every single administration during the First Republic was overthrown by military coup d'état.

The First Republic would finally collapse after the overthrow of the liberal president Valentín Gómez Farías, through a rebellion led by his former vice-president, General Antonio López de Santa Anna who had switched sides. Once in power, the conservatives, who had long been critical of the federal system and blamed it for the nation's instability, repealed the Constitution of 1824 on October 23, 1835, and the Federal Republic became a unitary state, the Centralist Republic. The unitary regime was formally established on December 30, 1836, with the enactment of the seven constitutional laws.

Background

Independence

The Spanish Empire disintegrated in the wake of Napoleon's invasion of Spain and the overthrow of the Spanish Bourbons in 1808. Throughout Spain and her colonies there was a widespread refusal to recognize Napoleon's brother Joseph II as the new French-backed king of Spain. The cleric Miguel Hidalgo y Costilla, who had long been part of a circle of intellectuals who sought to reform the colonial system triggered the Mexican War of Independence in 1810 by accusing the Spanish ruling classes of seeking to recognize Joseph Bonaparte, while proclaiming loyalty to the imprisoned Ferdinand VII. The subsequent uprising would go on to seriously threaten the capital yet it was ultimately defeated within a year and Hidalgo was captured and executed.

The war would continue and be organized under Jose Maria Morelos who would gain control over much of southern New Spain. At the Congress of Chilpancingo in 1813 he renounced loyalty to Ferdinand and expounded a plan for an independent, Republican Mexico. The Constitution of Apatzingán was ratified on October 22, 1814, but it would never come into effect. The tide of war began to turn against the insurgents, and Morelos was captured and executed in 1815.

Meanwhile, in Spain, the Spanish government in exile, the liberal dominated Cortes of Cádiz had included representatives from the colonies, and taken into account many of the colonial grievances which were leading to independence. The consequent liberal Constitution of 1812, was promulgated during the Morelos insurgency. It established a system of ‘provincial deputations’ which granted more autonomy to local governments in the colonies while also providing for freedom of speech. The newly liberated Mexican press however simply inflamed anti-Spanish sentiment, Morelos' rebellion continued, and on the pretext of necessity for subduing the rebels, the constitution was suspended in New Spain the same year it was proclaimed, making Mexican liberals lose hope of attaining reform within the colonial system, while not forgetting the local provincial autonomy that they had temporarily been granted.

Independence was finally gained in 1821 under Agustín de Iturbide's Plan of Iguala which was a conservative reaction against the outbreak of the Trienio Liberal in Spain, but also a compromise with those Mexican liberals who sought equality before the law. Mexico was to have its independence under a commonwealth system with constitutional monarchy maintaining ties to Spain and commissioners were sent to Spain to offer the throne to a Spanish prince. The Spanish government refused the offer and a popular demonstration led to Iturbide himself assuming the throne. The Emperor immediately however began to clash with legislature and showed himself determined to have supreme authority over the government, even shutting congress down and replacing it with a body of loyalists. Iturbide struggled to pay the army, and eventually Santa Anna pronounced in favor of a Federal Republic in his Plan of Casa Mata. After being unable to suppress the rebellion Iturbide reconvened congress and offered his abdication after which he was exiled from the nation. He would attempt to return the following year while Mexico was under a provisional government only to be captured and executed.

Provisional Government of Mexico 

The provisional government was led by a triumvirate consisting of Nicolas Bravo, Pedro Negrete, and Guadalupe Victoria, the latter who would eventually go on to become the first president of Mexico. Congress organized elections for a new Constituent Congress that was meant to draft a new constitution, and the newly elected body met on November 7, 1823.

Controversy now raged over whether the new republic was going to be a federal system or a unitary system. The most prominent opponent of the federal system was Father Mier who had previously made a name for himself as a critic of Iturbide. He argued that the nation needed a strong centralized government to guard against Spanish attempts to reconquer her former colony, and that a federation rather suited a situation in which previously sovereign states were attempting to unite as had happened with the United States. New Spain had never been made up of autonomous provinces. Federation for Mexico, according to Mier would then be an act of separation rather than unification and only lead to internal conflict. The arguments for federation prevailed however, motivated by the long struggle during the independence war to seek as much autonomy as possible, and an eagerness to reap the salaries that would accompany local bureaucracies. For historian Timothy Anna, "the transition to a  federal republic [as opposed to the initial triumph of independence] was the real 'revolution' because the old gave way to the new in Mexican history." Mexico decided upon federation as a practical compromise between the need for effective national government and the desire for granting the provinces a voice. Ramon Arizpe, former deputy to the Cortes of Leon and one of the champions of federalism was tasked with drafting the new constitution and he modeled the document on the Constitution of the United States. The completed constitution was published on October 4, 1824.

In the new federated republican era, the transition from the colonial legal system was not easy.  Crown edicts no longer had force and new legal codes had not yet come into being. No one knew which laws were valid, there were vacancies in the courts, and few trained lawyers. States were accorded the power over most civil and criminal legal matters. The separate court for merchants, the consulado, was abolished, but the military and church courts retained jurisdiction over soldiers and clergy respectively as part of their fuero. For members of indigenous communities, the removal of colonial-era protections of their community lands and their access to the special General Indian Court made them more vulnerable in the new federated republican order.
 
The first presidential elections were held the same week that the constitution was promulgated adn Guadalupe Victoria, war hero of independence, and one of the three members of the triumvirate was elected the first president of the First Mexican Republic.

Victoria Administration

Fierce political controversy over federalism and centralism continued during the Victoria Administration, finding itself based in Mexico's Masonic lodges. Conservative supporters of centralism and surviving supporters of monarchy tended to belong to the Scottish Rite and were called Esoceses while liberal supporters of federalism tended to gather in the York Rite and were called Yorkinos. Participants in political discussions at the lodges were bound by secrecy, and  there was some effort in the government to ban such secret societies, but it came to nothing.

In order to fund the government the Victoria administration had taken out a loan from a British banking house, but the bank failed in 1827, leading to a financial crisis in the Mexican government.

Tensions against the Spaniards who remained in Mexico were also rising at this time and they sought to defend themselves by supporting the Escoceses. Calls to expel the Spaniards from the country challenged the tenets of the newly established liberal constitution, which stressed equality before the law. The leading liberal intellectual, José María Luis Mora, was opposed to Spaniards’ expulsion as a matter of principle, but also on practical grounds, since Spanish merchants had been vital to the flourishing of the colonial economy. Nonetheless, the Spaniards were expelled in December, 1827, under the pretext of suppressing sedition.

On December 23, 1827, the conservatives proclaimed the Plan of Montaño, demanding the expulsion of Poinsett, the end to secret societies, and the dismissal of the current cabinet, the latter measure due to the belief that the Yorkino dominated government was about to take decisive measures to suppress the Escoceses. The insurrection was ironically led by Victoria's own vice-president, Nicholas Bravo, but it was suppressed and Bravo was exiled.

More violence would follow the presidential elections of 1828. They were won by the conservative candidate Gomez Pedraza, but supporters of the liberal candidate Vicente Guerrero refused to recognize the results and petitioned congress to nullify them. The efforts were rejected, and the government took advantage of the electoral challenge to begin prosecuting the liberal opposition. This in turn only inflamed further violence which spread to the capital. As the tide seemed to be turning against him, Gomez Pedraza fled the country, and Guerrero was able to have his victory ratified by congress.

Guerrero Administration

For Guerrero's supporters, a visibly mixed-race man from Mexico's periphery becoming president of Mexico was a step toward in what one 1829 pamphleteer called "the reconquest of this land by its legitimate owners" and called Guerrero "that immortal hero, favorite son of Nezahualcoyotzin", the famous ruler of prehispanic Texcoco.

In his inaugural address, he pointed to his long service to the nation fighting for independence, but also importantly to his holding of high office in independent Mexico. He said, "The representatives are to be found in all classes of the people, and the true titles of superiority, the only ones that cause distinction and preference, are discovered wherever talent and virtue appear." In his first address to congress, he pledged that "the administration is obliged to procure the widest possible benefits and apply them from the palace of the rich to the wooden shack of the humble laborer." He went on to extol liberal values of equality before the law and rewards for those with talent and virtue.

The first major crisis faced by the new government was an attempt by Spain to reconquer its former colony. Troops were landed at the tropical port of Tampico, upon which they began to succumb to yellow fever and were defeated by the Mexican military. Guerrero had been given emergency powers for the crisis and he was slow to relinquish them even after the crisis had subsided, which became a point of contention for his opponents.

Slavery was abolished, there was an attempt to regulate the press, and the government attempted to alleviate the financial crisis by passing new federal taxes. The new taxes were then ignored by every single state.

Vice President Bustamante and the opposition, under the pretext of opposing Guerrero's emergency powers, proclaimed against the government, and Guerrero left the capital to oppose the insurgents, but Bustamante's movement triumphed and he was installed as president in February 1830, with congress declaring Guerrero to be unfit for office.

Bustamante Administration

With President Bustamante, the escoceses or conservatives came into power for the first time. Lucas Alamán, the most prominent conservative intellectual of the time, would also be added to the cabinet and would play a notable role in guiding government policy.

The administration managed to succeed in substantially alleviating the chronic financial instability and in his address to congress on January first, 1832,  Bustamante could record surpluses in most of the states and in the federal government. Strong measures were taken in response to the emerging crisis in Texas. The amount of American settlers was making it difficult for Mexico to administer the area, and further colonization was prohibited in 1830. General Manuel de Mier y Terán was sent into the region to build a string of forts.

Ex-president Guerrero remained at large but was captured and on February, 1831 was executed., causing an uproar amongst the opposition. The government was also accused of acting increasingly autocratically. The liberal opposition appealed to Santa Anna to pronounce against the government and he eventually began an uprising on January, 1832 which lasted until the end of the year and eventually proved to be successful. Gomez Pedraza was brought back to serve out the remaining three months of the term to which he had initially won against Guerrero in 1828. He was succeeded by Santa Anna with the liberal Valentín Gómez Farías as his vice president.

Gómez Farías Administration

During this time, Santa Anna and Gómez Farías shared power by alternating offices with Santa Anna repeatedly retiring to his estate at Manga del Clavo while Gómez Farías took care of official matters. Gómez Farías attempted to reduce the size of the army and also to pass a radical program of anti-clerical measures. The government closed all church schools including the university at Mexico City. It annulled monastic oaths and claimed for itself the right to pick officials in the church. It also suppressed monasteries in the north of the country. Members of congress wished to prosecute former members of the Bustamante administration, but Gomez Farias sought to moderate these measures. In response to the uprisings that were flaring up around the nation, a Ley de Caso expelled from the country many conservatives, including ex-president Bustamante. Many generals associated with the previous administration were removed from office leading to further opposition. The government around this time also had to deal with an epidemic of cholera.

The uprisings against the nation were mostly pacified, but the opposition continued to clamor for Gómez Farías's overthrew, fueled by the ongoing anti-clerical campaign. Opponents of Gómez Farías had long sought help from vice-president Santa Anna in overthrowing the government, and after initially ignoring them, even participating in campaigns against the rebels, he eventually acquiesced in April, 1834. He proclaimed the Plan of Cuernavaca, condemning Gómez Farías's reforms. The president was overthrown and prominent liberal and federalist thinkers José María Luis Mora and Lorenzo de Zavala were exiled from the nation. Gómez Farías's reforms would eventually be attempted again by the government in during the pivotal La Reforma period.

Collapse of the First Republic
As part of his revolution Santa Anna dissolved the national congress, state congresses, and replaced state governors and municipal governments with loyalists. He however also maintained that the Constitution of 1824 was still in effect and held elections for a new congress before the end of the year.  Santa Anna at this point retired as he had during the Gomez Farias administration and he was replaced by Miguel Barragan.

On October 23, 1835, the bicameral congress decreed to unite and turn itself into a constituent congress tasked with drafting a new constitution. The resulting centralist document came to be known as the Siete Leyes, and was formally promulgated in December, 1836. Now would begin a decade of conservative and centralist rule led by Santa Anna whom the congress expected to be the first president under the new constitution.

Certain regions of the nation responded to the new constitution by attempting to secede. In 1836, after a decade of failing to gain provincial autonomy, Texas revolted, and the Texans were joined in their struggle by the exiled champion of federalism Lorenzo de Zavala who would go on to be the first vice-president of the nascent Texas republic. Yucatán would follow and succeed in 1839 after which it would establish relations with Texas. Other uprisings were successfully crushed by the centralist government.

Conflicts with Indigenous peoples in Northern Mexico 

In Alta California during the late colonial era the Franciscans had established missions from San Diego in the south to the San Franciscan bay area in the north.  In 1824, indigenous in four central coast missions revolted against ill-treatment by non-indigenous authorities. The Chumash revolt was suppressed, the mission indigenous pardoned and urged to return to the missions, but the revolt was serious and challenged the narrative of peaceful mission indigenous.

The republic would largely adopt Spanish colonial policy with regard to the Apache, establicimiento, or the system by which the Spanish sought to settle the Apache and make them sedentary by offering these Apaches de Paz (Peaceful Apaches) goods and land in exchange for peace and abandonment of nomadic lifestyle. The Mexican state followed the practice of its Spanish colonial predecessor, with inadequate military resources to suppress the northern indigenous groups that did not recognize outsiders sovereignty over their territory. Mexico faced an insufficient defense network against the Comanches and Apaches in the Northern States. Even going so far as to include a royal signature, pre-Republican Mexico reinstated Spanish Indian policies to the letter. While some peace treaties did exist between locals and los indios, the peace did not last long, as Apaches would often simply take their violence elsewhere when villages proved to be too difficult to raid. With these ineffective policies in place, combined with an ever-evolving and adapting Comanche Empire, the Early Republic faced a formidable foe with an inadequate infrastructure. The lack of appropriate defense against raids might not have been so large of a problem for the Republic, if establicimiento had not all but been forgone by the 1830s, with post-independence 1820s economic instability causing many regions to drastically reduce rations to the Apaches de Paz.

The Apache were supplied with guns by US American merchants. Goods including guns and shoes were sold to the Apache, the latter being discovered by Mexican forces when they found traditional Apache trails with American shoe prints instead of moccasin prints. The cycle of heightened violence between Mexicans and Apaches further destabilized the Republic, with bloody and violent suppression of Apaches. Discontent among the northern Mexican states reached a peak in 1837, when the governor of the Sonora declared that "the United States has already as much as declared a state of war between our two nations" with regard to both the annexation of Texas and the illegal enterings/selling of weapons committed by United States' citizens.

Notes

Further reading

Anna, Timothy. "Demystifying Early Nineteenth-Century Mexico. Mexican Studies 9, no. 1 Winter 1993, 119-37.
Anna, Timothy. Forging Mexico, 1821–1835. Lincoln: University of Nebraska Press 1998. 
Anna, Timothy. "Inventing Mexico: provincehood and Nationhood after Independence." Bulletin of Latin American Research 15, no. 1 (Jan. 1996), 7–17.
Anna, Timothy. "Iturbide, Congress, and Constitutional Monarchy in Mexico", In The Political Economy of Spanish America in the Age of Revolution, 1750–1850, ed. Kenneth J. Andrien and Lyman L. Johnson, 17–38. Albuquerque: University of New Mexico Press 1994.
Archer, Christon. "Fashioning a New Nation." In The Oxford History of Mexico, Michael C. Meyer and William H. Beezley. New York, Oxford University Press 2000. 
Bazant, Jan. "From Independence to the Liberal Republic, 1821–1867" in Mexico Since Independence. Leslie Bethell, ed. Cambridge: Cambridge University Press 1991, pp. 1–48.
Costeloe, Michael P. La Primera República Federal de México, 1824–1835. Mexico: Fondo de Cultura Económica 1975. 
Green, Stanley C. The Mexican Republic: The First Decade, 1823–1832.  Pittsburgh: University of Pittsburgh Press 1987.
Guardino, Peter. "Barbarism or Republican Law? Guerrero's Peasants and National Politics, 1820–1846." Hispanic American Historical Review 75, no. 2 (May 1995): 185–213.
Guedea, Virginia. "The Old Colonialism Ends, the New Colonialism Begins." In The Oxford History of Mexico, Michael C. Meyer and William H. Beezley. New York, Oxford University Press 2000. 
Hale, Charles A. Mexican Liberalism in the Age of Mora. New Haven: Yale University Press 1968.
 
Stevens, Donald Fithian. Origins of Instability in Early Republican Mexico. Duke University Press 1991. 
Tenenbaum, Barbara, The Politics of Penury: Debts and Taxes in Mexico, 1821–1856. Albuquerque: University of New Mexico Press 1986. 
Van Young, Eric. Stormy Passage: Mexico from Colony to Republic, 1750-1850. Lanham MD: Rowman and Littlefield 2022. 
Vázquez, Josefina Zoraida. "War and Peace with the United States." In The Oxford History of Mexico, Michael C. Meyer and William H. Beezley. New York, Oxford University Press 2000. 
Vincent, Theodore G. The Legacy of Vicente Guerrero, Mexico's First Black Indian President''. University of Florida Press 2001.  

 02
Mexico, First
1820s in Mexico
1830s in Mexico
History of Mexico

States and territories established in 1824
States and territories disestablished in 1835
19th century in Mexico
Former republics